Săbăoani is a commune in Neamț County, Western Moldavia, Romania. It is composed of two villages, Săbăoani and Traian.

In 2002, the commune had a population of 10,301, of whom all but four were declared ethnic Romanians. 98.6% of residents were Roman Catholic, 1.3% Romanian Orthodox, and 0.1% belonged to other Christian denominations.

Situated in the eastern part of the county, on the border with Iași County, Săbăoani is the largest rural settlement in Neamț County.

The commune is traversed south to north by national road DN2 (part of European route E85). Route DN28 starts in Săbăoani; bifurcating from DN2, it goes east towards Iași and on to the border with Moldova. The Săbăoani train station serves the CFR Line 500, which starts in Bucharest and runs north, to the border with Ukraine.

Natives
 Aurel Percă
 Mihai Robu
 Valentin Robu

References

Communes in Neamț County
Localities in Western Moldavia